The Jedi series of comics was written by John Ostrander and Jeremy Barlow, and was published by Dark Horse Comics from 20 August 2003 to 21 July 2004 as a series of one-shots chronicling the actions of five Jedi during the Clone Wars.

Jedi: Mace Windu

Synopsis
Mace Windu is a male human from the planet Haruun Kal. Mace Windu was a senior member of the Jedi High Council since the age of 28, second only in authority to Yoda. He served as leader of the clone armies as a peace-keeper, known for his fierce dedication, rigorous example, and steady discipline. He is very knowledgeable of Jedi philosophy and history. A good and faithful friend of Yoda. He spent most of his time at the Jedi temple in Coruscant. It is notable that Mace Windu never trusted Anakin Skywalker. He saw Anakin's potential, but also realized his danger something that Yoda was not as able to sense. Mace Windu is portrayed in the Star Wars films by Samuel L. Jackson in Episodes I,II, and III.

Dramatis personae
Asajj Ventress
Cei Vookto
Dama Montalvo
Count Dooku
Ki-Adi-Mundi
K'Kruhk
Ky Narec
Mace Windu
Mira
Quinlan Vos
Rhad Tarn
Sian Jeisel
Sora Bulq
Tholme
Yoda

Jedi: Shaak Ti

Synopsis
Shaak Ti is a female Togruta, a colorful and exotic alien species, from the planet Shili. Shaak Ti is a member of the Jedi High Council and a Jedi General during the Clone Wars. She is a very well respected warrior, known for slaying Artel Darc and surviving an encounter with General Grievous. Shaak Ti is portrayed in the Star Wars films by Orli Shoshan in Episodes II & III.

Dramatis personae
Agen Kolar
Count Dooku
Fe Sun (Mentioned only)
Lyshaa
Plo Koon
Quinlan Vos
Ryyk
Sagoro Autem
Shaak Ti
Shogar Tok
Shon Kon Ray

Jedi: Aayla Secura

Synopsis
Aayla Secura was first brought into the Star Wars saga by Dark Horse Comics. George Lucas took a liking to the character and decided to use her. Aayla Secura is a female Twi'lek, an bluish alien species, from the planet Ryloth. Aayla is very skilled in lightsaber combat. She was a Jedi Knight and Clone Wars General. Aayla caved to the Dark Side for a period when she was involved with Volfe Karkko. She died in the tragedy of Order 66 on Felucia. Aayla Secura is portrayed in the Star Wars films by Amy Allen in Episodes II & III.

Dramatis personae
Aayla Secura
An'ya Kuro ("Dark Woman")
Aurra Sing
Aven'sai'Ulrahk
Elsah'sai'Moro
Fenn Booda
Kit Fisto
Quinlan Vos
Tholme
T'ra Saa
Vien'sai'Malloc
Xiaan Amersu

Jedi: Count Dooku

Synopsis
Dooku, also known as Darth Tyranus or Count Dooku, is a male Human from the planet Serenno. Padawan of Yoda and Master of Qui-Gon Jin. Dooku was a master swordsman known throughout the galaxy. He served as a combat instructor in the Jedi Temple. It is said that only Mace Windu and Yoda are considered on equal terms. Dooku was a Jedi Master turned Sith Lord. He was brought to the dark side by Darth Sidious replacing Darth Maul. Dooku is portrayed in the Star Wars films by Christopher Lee in Episodes II & III.

Dramatis personae
Count Dooku
Jeisel
Kadrian Sey
Kai Justiss
Khaleen Hentz
Mace Windu
Quinlan Vos
Shylar
Sora Bulq
Spurlick
Suribran Tu
Tholme
Tinté Vos
Tol Skorr
Tsui Choi
Zurros

Jedi: Yoda

Synopsis
Yoda is of an unknown species from an unknown planet. He stands just 66 cm tall, yet he is the most renowned and powerful Jedi Master in all galactic history. Known for his mastery of the force, lightsaber combat skills, and his unparalleled wisdom. He is a member of the Jedi High Council reigning Grand Master of the Jedi Order. Some of Yoda's biggest mistakes in judgment were Supreme Chancellor Palpatine (Dark Lord of The Sith, Darth Sidious) and Anakin Skywalker (Lord Darth Vader). Yoda's voice is portrayed in the Star Wars films by Frank Oz in Episodes I, II, III, V, & VI

Dramatis personae
Alaric
Cal
Clutch
CR57
Dekluun
Mace Windu
Mas Amedda
Moje
Navi
Obi-Wan Kenobi
Oppo Rancisis
Palpatine
Pix
Tyffix
Tyr
Yoda

Notes

References
Wallace, Daniel / Suffin, Michael (2002) The New Essential Guide to Characters, 1st Edition
Reynolds, David (2002) Star Wars: Attack of the Clones: the Visual Dictionary, hardcover
Ostrander, John http://www.darkhorse.com/Comics. Dark Horse, October 5, 2009
http://www.imdb.com/title/tt0121765/fallcredits#cast. October 5, 2009
http://www.starwars.com/databank/character. Star Wars. October 5, 2009

Jedi